Neil Chandler (6 May 1949 – 24 June 2022) was an Australian rules footballer who played for Carlton and St Kilda in the VFL.

Chandler played with Carlton during a successful era for the club and was a member of three premiership teams. He was a reserve in their 1968 and 1970 flags but earned a starting spot in 1972, playing on a half forward flank. Midway into the 1974 season he crossed to St Kilda before retiring at the end of the year.

References

External links

Blueseum profile

1949 births
2022 deaths
Carlton Football Club players
Carlton Football Club Premiership players
St Kilda Football Club players
Australian rules footballers from Victoria (Australia)
Three-time VFL/AFL Premiership players